Richard Joseph Anderson (born January 26, 1944) is a former American football player who played for the New Orleans Saints of the National Football League in 1967. During his brief NFL career, Anderson played in two games and scored two points on a safety. He played college football at Ohio State University.

References

1944 births
Living people
American football tackles
Ohio State Buckeyes football players
New Orleans Saints players
Players of American football from Ohio
Sportspeople from Massillon, Ohio